Kaadu Kudure is a 1979 Indian Kannada-language drama film directed, written and composed by Chandrashekhara Kambara and produced by Wheel Productions. The story is based on Kambara's own play Kaadu Kudure. The film's cast came mainly from a theater background including Maanu, Sundarashri, Maithili and Malathi Rao.

Acclaimed singer Shimoga Subbanna's singing of the title song earned him National Film Award for the year 1979.

Cast 
 Maanu
 Sundarashree
 Maithili
 Swarnamma
 Malathi Rao
 Krishna
 Annaji
 Kaminidharan
 Narayan
 Ramachandra

Soundtrack 
The music was composed by Chandrashekhara Kambara. The title song earned the singer the National Film Award for the year 1979.

Awards
 National Film Award for Best Male Playback Singer - Shimoga Subbanna for "Kaadu Kudure Odibandittha"

References

External links 
 
 Kaadu Kudure at Raaga

1979 films
1970s Kannada-language films
Indian films based on plays